Filistea is a genus of parasitic flies in the family Tachinidae.

Species
Filistea aureofasciata (Curran, 1927)
Filistea verbekei Cerretti & O’Hara, 2016

Distribution
Cameroon, Congo, Nigeria, Uganda.

References

Diptera of Africa
Exoristinae
Tachinidae genera